Golsinda basicornis is a species of beetle in the family Cerambycidae. It was described by Charles Joseph Gahan in 1894. It is known from Myanmar, China, Vietnam, Laos, and Thailand.

References

Mesosini
Beetles described in 1894